Tamar is the debut studio album by American R&B singer Tamar Braxton. It was released on March 21, 2000, by DreamWorks Records and RedZone Entertainment. The album features guest appearances from Missy Elliott, Jermaine Dupri and Amil, while the production handled by Tim & Bob, Tricky Stewart, among others. Originally entitled Ridiculous, it debuted at number 127 on the US Billboard 200 and number 42 on the Top R&B/Hip-Hop Albums chart. Braxton later admitted in interviews for her second album Love and War that she was not fond of this album due to not having any creative control.

Background
Before the official release, Braxton was the lead singer of The Braxtons, after her sisters Traci and Toni had to leave the group, which left them as a trio of Tamar, Trina and Towanda. After the release of their debut album, So Many Ways (1996), Braxton was offered a solo recording contract with DreamWorks, which she happened to leave the group and begin her solo career. In 2004, Tamar's sister Towanda Braxton appeared on the reality TV series Starting Over during its second season, revealing that Tamar signed a solo contract without telling her or Trina that she left The Braxtons group.

In 1999, she released the EP, Tamar: Just Cuz to generate buzz about her debut album. The Tamar: Just Cuz EP contained 4 songs, "Just Cuz", "Let Him Go" (featuring Solé), "It's Time" (featuring Grand Puba) and "Get Mine".

Her album was originally going to be called Ridiculous, which would have been released in late 1999. Some songs recorded for this album remain unreleased, as this project was scrapped.

Critical reception

AllMusic editor Roxanne Blanford called Tamar both "impressive and enjoyable." She foung that "this recording is primarily a quiet display of Tamar's competence at present day rhythm & blues with some contemporary hip-hop flavor thrown in. If it wasn't such an all-around good listen, it would certainly be worthy of recognition on the basis of its professional presentation alone."

Track listing

Personnel
 Keyboards and drum programming: Tim & Bob, Jermaine Dupri, Bryan-Michael Cox, Darrell "Delite" Allamby, Tricky Stewart, The Co-Stars
 Piano: Les Butler, Bob Robinson 
 Acoustic guitar: Bob Robinson 
 Spanish guitar: Bob Robinson 
 Guitar: Paul Pesco, Marlon McClain 
 Percussion: Luis C. Conte 
 Background vocals: Tamar Braxton, Darcy Aldridge, Mýa (uncredited), Lil' Mo, Missy Elliott, LaTocha Scott, Darrell "Delite" Allamby
 Recording engineers: Jermaine Dupri, Brian K. Smith, Tim Kelley, Carlisle Young, Ben Arrindell, Rob Hunter, Christopher "Tricky" Stewart, Kevin "KD" Davis
 Mixing engineers: Phil Tan, Brian K. Smith, Tim Kelley, Carlisle Young, Ben Arrindell, Kevin "KD" Davis
 Photography: Randee St. Nicholas
 Design: Orabor

Charts

References

2000 debut albums
Tamar Braxton albums
Albums produced by Missy Elliott
Albums produced by Tim & Bob
Dance-pop albums by American artists
DreamWorks Records albums